Isaiah Harris Hughes (25 December 1813 – 24 May 1891), better known as the Fakir of Ava, was a 19th-century stage magician, the teacher of Harry Kellar.

Biography
Hughes was born in Essex, England, but moved to the United States and became an illusionist. He would wear dark makeup, exotic clothing, and claim to come from Ava in Burma. He billed himself as "The Fakir of Ava, Chief of Staff of Conjurors to His Sublime Greatness the Nanka of Aristaphae". In addition to billing standard European tricks as great Oriental feats, he invented many tricks of his own. He later gave up his costume and performed in formal evening dress.

After gaining wealth through his performances, he purchased a large property in Buffalo, New York at the time the city was rapidly growing thanks to the Erie Canal. In 1874, he married Sarah Stanfield, the teenaged daughter of Frederick Clarkson Stanfield, who painted theatrical scenery. They had two sons, Frank Fakir and Harry Ava. He died of pneumonia in 1891.

Professional career

Promotion
Hughes pioneered public relations in his skill at getting local newspapers to promote his show with journalism rather than advertisements and to report on the show afterwards.

Double bills
To increase the likelihood of positive word-of-mouth after a show, Hughes would add other entertainers to the bill, including ventriloquist John W. Whiston, or add himself to another bill, such as the circus of P. T. Barnum.

Gift shows
In 1857, Hughes came up with the idea of a "gift show", a gimmick that was later used by many magicians in the 19th century.  In his gift shows, Hughes would, in addition to performing magic, give away door prizes.  While most of the gifts were inexpensive trinkets such as second-hand watches or brass jewelry, he would also give away larger prizes such as sewing machines, live pigs, half-tons of coal, complete sets of bedroom furniture, musical instruments including pianos, and packets of cash. The concept excited audiences and increased profits because of the large crowds it drew — "I quickly put South again and coined money," said Hughes later.

Name
The fame of Hughes and his show resulted in his name being appropriated by other magicians. He prefixed "genuine" to Fakir of Ava and wrote letters to warn consumers.

Influence
The magician Howard Thurston said, "The historian of magic can trace an unbroken line of succession from the Fakir of Ava in 1830 to my own entertainment." Most of these lines of succession begin with Hughes's second apprentice, Harry Kellar.

When Harry Kellar, later known as the "Dean of American Magicians", was a youth, he saw Hughes perform, and immediately decided that he wanted to be a magician himself.  He became Hughes' assistant, and thus began his career as a traveling stage magician. Between his apprenticeship and creating his own show, Kellar would perform as the Fakir of Ava in an aging Hughes's place.

Effects 

Some of the effects Hughes performed included (from playbills)

 The Enchanted Canopy
 The  Bank or Mysterious Treasury in the Air
 Hindoo Cup Trick
 The Mephistophole's Hat
 The Card Printer
 The Fairy Star
 The Great Orange Trick
 The Chinese Plate Illusion
 How to Cook an Omelet, and Produce Game and Ring
 The Bank Note and Enchanted Candle
 The Flying Watches
 The Enchanted Fishery
 The Express Laundry
 The Wonderful Hat
 The Witches Pole or the obedient Mysterious Blood Writing on the Arm
 Vanishing Cage, Balls and Game
 Laughable Ribbon and Paper Trick
 The Great African Box and Sack Feat (Mysterious Appearance and Disappearance)
 The Sealed Packet Or Wonders of Supernatural Vision
 Angel's Flight through Mid-Air!
 The Elements
 Dove of Buddha
 Wizard Portfolio
 Mystic Clock
 Japanese Butterfly Trick
 Aerial Couch
 Gun Feat
 Bottle Feat
 Great Second Sight Mystery

References

 Report from William Bagley to Mose G. Pierce, 13 February 1845

1813 births
1891 deaths
People from Essex
American magicians
Burials at Forest Lawn Cemetery (Buffalo)
Deaths from pneumonia